Warwick Neville (born 31 December 1948) is an Australian cricketer. He played in two first-class matches for Queensland in 1971/72.

See also
 List of Queensland first-class cricketers

References

External links
 

1948 births
Living people
Australian cricketers
Queensland cricketers
Cricketers from Melbourne